Te Rua Manga or The Needle is a mountain on Rarotonga in the Cook Islands. It has an elevation of 413 metres above sea level. The spire itself is a breccia structure. There is a walking track to the base of the spire.

See also
 Geography of the Cook Islands

References

Rarotonga
Te Rua Manga
Mountains of Oceania